Genco Erkal (born 28 March 1938) is a Turkish drama actor. He starred in the 1983 film A Season in Hakkari, which won the Silver Bear - Special Jury Prize at the 33rd Berlin International Film Festival. In April 2021, he announced that due to tweets in which he criticized the Turkish Government he was being prosecuted for insulting the President.

Filmography

References

External links

1938 births
Living people
Turkish male film actors
Male actors from Istanbul